Portal del Norte is one of the terminus stations of the TransMilenio mass-transit system of Bogotá, Colombia, which opened in the year 2000.

Location

Portal del Norte is located in northern Bogotá, specifically on Autopista Norte with Calle 175.

It serves the La Uribe, Villa del Prado, Nueva Zelandia, and Northwest San Antonio neighborhoods.

History

In late 2001, after the opening of the Portal de Usme, the Portal del Norte was opened as the third terminus in the system.

Nearby there are Éxito and Home Center superstores, as well as a Colsubsidio and a small shopping center called Panama.

In mid-2005, its entire fleet of feeder buses made by Mercedes Benz and operated by Alnorte
were renovated to be put into non-TransMilenio service. A new operator, Alnorte Fase 2 began service
with new Volkswagen buses that bore the branding of Brazil's Busscar.

Station services

Old trunk services

Main line service

Feeding services 

The following feeder routes also work:

  to the Mirandela neighborhood
  circular to the sector of the Gardens
  to the San Antonio neighborhood
  to the El Codito neighborhood
  to the San Cristobal Norte neighborhood
  to the San José neighborhood
  Circular Eastern Express 170 (Peak morning time)
  circular to the neighborhood Verbenal
  to the Andalusia neighborhood (Monday to Friday from 5:30 a.m. to 8:30 A.m only operates at rush hour)

Inter-city services

Portal del Norte also has inter-city services to
Chia, Zipaquirá, Cajicá, Tabio, Tenjo, Gachancipá and Tocancipá.

External links
TransMilenio
mapa interactivo

See also
Bogotá
TransMilenio
List of TransMilenio Stations

TransMilenio